Courtney Messingham (born October 23, 1966) is an American football coach and former player. Messingham served as the head football coach at Upper Iowa University from 2003 to 2004, compiling a record of 3–17. He played college football at the University of Northern Iowa.

Head coaching record

References

External links
 Kansas State profile

1966 births
Living people
American football defensive backs
American football quarterbacks
Indiana Hoosiers football coaches
Iowa Lakes Lakers football coaches
Iowa State Cyclones football coaches
Kansas State Wildcats football coaches
Missouri State Bears football coaches
North Dakota State Bison football coaches
Northern Iowa Panthers football players
St. Ambrose Fighting Bees football coaches
Southern Miss Golden Eagles football coaches
Truman Bulldogs football coaches
Upper Iowa Peacocks football coaches